Jonathan Butler is a 1987 album by South African singer-guitarist Jonathan Butler.

Track listing
Lies (US#27; UK#18, 1987)
Love Songs, Candlelight & You
Going Home
I Miss Your Love Tonight
 Holding On
One More Dance
Take Good Care Of Me
Barenese
All Over You
Overflowing
Lovin' You
Sunset
Say We'll Be Together
Give A Little More Lovin'
Reunion
High Tide

Charts

Weekly charts

Year-end charts

References

1987 albums